The Men's 10 metre platform competition of the diving events at the 2015 World Aquatics Championships was held on 1–2 August 2015.

Results
The preliminary round was held on 1 August at 10:00. The semifinal was held on 1 August at 15:00. The final was held on 2 August at 19:30.

Green denotes finalists

Blue denotes semifinalists

References

Men's 10 metre platform